The following lists events that happened during 1991 in New Zealand.

Population
 Estimated population as of 31 December: 3,516,000
 Increase since 31 December 1990: 40,900 (1.18%) Note that there is a discontinuity between the 1990 and 1991 figures as Statistics NZ switched from using the de facto population concept to estimated resident population.
 Males per 100 Females: 99.7

Incumbents

Regal and viceregal
Head of State – Elizabeth II
Governor-General – The Hon Dame Catherine Anne Tizard, GCMG, GCVO, DBE, QSO

Government
The 43rd New Zealand Parliament continued. Government was The National Party, led by Jim Bolger. National controlled nearly seventy percent of the seats in Parliament.

Speaker of the House – Robin Gray
Prime Minister – Jim Bolger
Deputy Prime Minister – Don McKinnon
Minister of Finance – Ruth Richardson
Minister of Foreign Affairs – Don McKinnon
Chief Justice — Sir Thomas Eichelbaum

Parliamentary opposition
 Leader of the Opposition –  Mike Moore (Labour) .
NewLabour Party – Jim Anderton

Main centre leaders
Mayor of Auckland – Les Mills
Mayor of Hamilton – Margaret Evans
Mayor of Wellington – Jim Belich
Mayor of Christchurch – Vicki Buck
Mayor of Dunedin – Richard Walls

Events

January
 2 January: description

February

March

April
 17 April: Prime Minister Jim Bolger stated, "We intend to keep New Zealand nuclear-free this term, next term, and the term after that."

June

July
 22 July The Resource Management Act 1991 passes into law after a third reading speech by Simon Upton.

August

September

October
1 October The Resource Management Act 1991 commences

November

December

Arts and literature
Lynley Hood wins the Robert Burns Fellowship.

See 1991 in art, 1991 in literature, :Category:1991 books

Performing arts

 Benny Award presented by the Variety Artists Club of New Zealand to Debbie Dorday.

Radio and television
CanWest takes management control of TV3.  

See: 1991 in New Zealand television, 1991 in television, List of TVNZ television programming, :Category:Television in New Zealand, TV3 (New Zealand), :Category:New Zealand television shows, Public broadcasting in New Zealand

Film
A Soldier's Tale
Chunik Bair
Grampire
Old Scores
Te Rua
The End of the Golden Weather

See: :Category:1991 film awards, 1991 in film, List of New Zealand feature films, Cinema of New Zealand, :Category:1991 films

Internet
See: NZ Internet History

Sport

Athletics
 Paul Herlihy wins his first national title in the men's marathon, clocking 2:13:34 on 2 March in New Plymouth, while Lee-Ann McPhillips claims her first in the women's championship (2:40:12).

Horse racing

Harness racing
 New Zealand Trotting Cup – Christopher Vance
 Auckland Trotting Cup – Christopher Vance

Thoroughbred racing

Shooting
Ballinger Belt – 
Graeme Berman (Australia)
Geoffrey Smith (Malvern), second, top New Zealander

Soccer
 The Chatham Cup is won by Christchurch United who beat Wellington United 2–1 in the final.

Births

January
 1 January – Peter Burling, sailor
 3 January – Joe Kayes, water polo player
 4 January – Olivia Tennet, actor
 5 January – Shane Savage, Australian rules footballer
 7 January
 Stephen Shennan, rugby union player
 Ben Smith, cricketer
 13 January – Mako Vunipola, rugby union player
 16 January – James Lentjes, rugby union player
 17 January
 Kate Chilcott, road cyclist
 Slade Griffin, rugby league player
 Brad Weber, rugby union player
 27 January 
 Beth Chote, actor
 Sebastine Ikahihifo, rugby league player
 28 January
 Jordan Kahu, rugby league player
 Mike Kainga, rugby union player
 29 January – Luke Whitelock, rugby union player
 30 January
 Mitchell Graham, rugby union player
 Matthew Wright, rugby league player

February
 2 February
 Caitlin Campbell, association footballer
 Solomona Sakalia, rugby union player
 3 February – Lima Sopoaga, rugby union player
 7 February – Ben Murdoch-Masila, rugby league player
 14 February – Michael Bracewell, cricketer
 15 February - Matt McEwan, cricketer
 16 February – Francis Saili, rugby union player
 18 February
 Danielle Hayes, fashion model
 Stacey Michelsen, field hockey player
 19 February – Ethan Mitchell, track cyclist
 20 February – Julia Edward, rower

March
 2 March – Mitchell Scott, rugby union player
 4 March – Sue Maroroa, chess player
 12 March
 Alofa Alofa, rugby union player
 Jed Brown, rugby union player
 14 March
 Taylor Gunman, road cyclist
 Kurt Pickard, BMX racer
 16 March – Michael Barry, cricketer
 17 March – Dylan Dunlop-Barrett, swimmer
 19 March – Colin Murphy, association footballer
 20 March – Liam Squire, rugby union player
 22 March
 Jordan Grant, field hockey player
 Amy McIlroy, lawn bowls player
 23 March – Jenny Hung, table tennis player
 25 March – Ryan Duffy, cricketer
 26 March – Courteney Lowe, road cyclist
 30 March – Jono Hickey, cricketer and rugby union player
 31 March – Codie Taylor, rugby union player

April
 1 April
 Graham Candy, singer-songwriter
 Iopu Iopu-Aso, rugby union player
 2 April
 Kara Pryor, rugby union player
 Brad Shields, rugby union player
 4 April – Sam Meech, sailor
 6 April – Paratene McLeod, basketball player
 9 April – Dominic Bird, rugby union player
 10 April - Kirsten Pearce, field hockey player
 17 April – Augusta Xu-Holland, actor
 20 April – Daniel Hawkins, rugby union player
 26 April – Isaac Liu, rugby league player
 27 April – Dylan Collier, rugby union and rugby league player
 29 April – Steven Luatua, rugby union player
 30 April – Brett Hampton, cricketer

May
 2 May – Patrick Bevin, road cyclist
 3 May – Hannah Wall, association footballer
 5 May – Joel Faulkner, rugby union player
 7 May – Kenny Ardouin, cleft lip and palate community advocate
 8 May – Waisake Naholo, rugby union player
 9 May
 Sosaia Feki, rugby league player
 Harriet Miller-Brown, alpine skier
 10 May – Gareth Anscombe, rugby union player
 11 May – Tony Ensor, rugby union player
 12 May
 Elizabeth Chuah Lamb, high jumper
 Greg Pleasants-Tate, rugby union player
 15 May – Matt Moulds, rugby union player
 20 May – Daryl Mitchell, cricketer
 24 May – Ian McPeake, cricketer
 25 May
 Maritino Nemani, rugby union player
 James Raideen, professional wrestler
 27 May
 Beauden Barrett, rugby union player
 Kayla Pratt, rower
 31 May – Brodie Retallick, rugby union player

June
 3 June
 Sarah McLaughlin, association footballer
 Ava Seumanufagai, rugby league player
 4 June
 Matt McIlwrick, rugby league player
 Ben Stokes, cricketer
 5 June – Chloe Tipple, sports shooter
 7 June – Amanda Landers-Murphy, squash player
 9 June – Ben Lam, rugby union player
 11 June – Nepo Laulala, rugby union player
 13 June – Lachie Ferguson, cricketer
 19 June – Zoe Stevenson, rower
 23 June – Mikhail Koudinov, gymnast
 25 June – Heiden Bedwell-Curtis, rugby union player
 26 June – Dakota Lucas, association footballer

July
 1 July
 Annalie Longo, association footballer
 Ruby Muir, endurance athlete
 7 July – Matt Hewitt, surfer
 12 July – Portia Woodman, rugby union player
 16 July – Sam Webster, track cyclist
 20 July
 Jarrad Butler, rugby union player
 Sam Lousi, rugby league and rugby union player
 24 July – Derone Raukawa, basketball player
 27 July – Ricky Wells, speedway rider
 28 July – Priyanka Xi, actor
 31 July – Tony Lamborn, rugby union player

August
 2 August
 Tom Bruce, cricketer
 Rob Thompson, rugby union player
 5 August 
 Gareth Evans, rugby union player
 Konrad Hurrell, rugby league player
 Robert Loe, basketball player
 13 August – Michael Cochrane, athlete
 16 August – Angie Smit, athlete
 22 August - Kenny Bromwich, rugby league player
 29 August – Samantha Harrison, field hockey player
 30 August – Ben Tameifuna, rugby union player

September
 2 September – Adam Henry, rugby league player
 4 September – Chevannah Paalvast, basketball player
 5 September – Nepia Fox-Matamua, rugby union player
 9 September – Adam Ling, rower
 11 September – Rebecca Sinclair, snowboarder
 13 September – Lee Allan, rugby union player
 14 September – Ryan De Vries, association footballer
 16 September – Luke Rowe, association footballer
 19 September – Owen Ivins, cricketer
 23 September – Cardiff Vaega, rugby union player
 26 September – Look Who's Talking, thoroughbred racehorse
 29 September – Stefi Luxton, snowboarder

October
 5 October – Gareth Kean, swimmer
 7 October – Stefan Marinovic, association footballer
 12 October – Nabil Sabio Azadi, artist
 15 October – Mandy Boyd, lawn bowls player
 19 October – Michael Allardice, rugby union player
 22 October – Levi Sherwood, freestyle motocross rider
 26 October – Blair Soper, cricketer
 27 October – Il Vicolo, standardbred racehorse
 28 October – Duane Bailey, basketballer
 29 October – Parris Goebel, dancer, choreographer and actor
 31 October – Charles Piutau, rugby union player

November
 5 November – Marco Rojas, association footballer
 6 November – Matt Faddes, rugby union player
 10 November - Ben Wheeler, cricketer
 11 November – Kate Broadmore, cricketer
 13 November – David Light, boxer
 15 November – Henry Nicholls, cricketer
 20 November – Tim Simona, rugby league player
 21 November – Peni Terepo, rugby league player
 22 November – Michael Vink, cyclist
 24 November – Richie Stanaway, motor racing driver
 27 November – Brooke Duff, singer-songwriter

December
 1 December – Richard Moore, motor racing driver
 3 December – Jarrod Firth, rugby union player
 7 December
 Samantha Charlton, field hockey player
 Chris Wood, association footballer
 11 December – Kahurangi Taylor, beauty pageant contestant
 13 December – Ruby Tui, rugby sevens player
 14 December
 Ben Henry, rugby league player
 Matt Henry, cricketer
 22 December – Paul Alo-Emile, rugby union player

Exact date unknown
 Holly Cassidy, beauty pageant contestant
 Annah Mac, singer-songwriter

Deaths

January–March
 4 January – Vernon Sale, cricketer (born 1915)
 12 February – Norman Fisher, boxer (born 1916)
 17 February – Fuzz Barnes, political activist (born 1902)
 18 February – Elizabeth Lissaman, potter (born 1901)
 9 March – Esther Blackie, cricketer (born 1916)
 14 March – Emily Carpenter, consumer advocate (born 1917)
 17 March – Peter Gordon, politician (born 1921)
 21 March – William Ditchfield, cricketer (born 1903)
 28 March – Henry Field, educational psychologist (born 1903)

April–June
 3 April – Peter Hooper, writer (born 1919)
 9 April – June Litman, journalist (born 1926)
 14 April – Bob Page, rowing coxswain (born 1936)
 20 April – Clare Mallory, children's writer (born 1913)
 28 April – Ngata Pitcaithly, educationalist (born 1906)
 18 May – Horace Smirk, medical academic (born 1902)
 31 May – Ian Milner, public servant, academic, alleged spy (born 1911)
 6 June – Stella Jones, playwright (born 1904)
 10 June – Jim Burrows, rugby union player and coach, cricketer, military leader (born 1904)
 18 June – Eric Halstead, politician and diplomat (born 1912)
 23 June – Charles Begg, radiologist and historian (born 1912)
 28 June – Sydney Josland, bacteriologist (born 1904)

July–September
 3 July – Trevor Horne, politician (born 1920)
 17 July – John O'Sullivan, cricketer (born 1918)
 21 July – Allan Wilson, biochemistry academic (born 1934)
 7 August 
 Billy T. James, entertainer (born 1948)
 Reginald Keeling, politician (born 1904)
 8 August – John Marsdon, cricketer (born 1928)
 22 August – Reuel Lochore, public servant and diplomat (born 1903)
 25 August – Charles Willocks, rugby union player (born 1919)
 17 September – Herb Mullon, philatelist (born 1905)
 25 September – Te Reo Hura, Rātana leader (born 1904)
 29 September – Sir Henry Kelliher, businessman and philanthropist (born 1896)

October–December
 6 October – Bob Loudon, rugby union player (born 1903)
 12 October – Murray Kay, association footballer (born 1905)
 13 October – Sir William Gentry, military leader (born 1899)
 22 October – Francis O'Brien, cricketer (born 1911)
 25 October – Roy Parsons, bookseller (born 1909)
 26 October – Clive Boyce, local-body politician (born 1918)
 8 November – Billy Savidan, athlete (born 1902)
 9 November – Jack Newton, rugby league player (born 1920)
 10 November
 Bill Gwynne, cricket umpire (born 1913)
 Colin Johnstone, rower (born 1921)
 11 November – Sir Tom Skinner, politician and trade union leader (born 1909)
 12 November – Kamal Bamadhaj, human rights activist (born 1970)
 24 November – Allan Pyatt, Anglican bishop (born 1916)
 28 November – Te Kari Waaka, Ringatū minister and community leader (born 1916)
 1 December
 Zin Harris, cricketer (born 1927)
 Jim Knox, trade union leader (born 1919)
 2 December – Ted Spillane, rugby league player (born 1905)
 6 December – Bill Beattie, photographer (born 1902)
 12 December – Julia Wallace, educationalist, politician, community leader (born 1907)
 20 December
 Beatrice Beeby, Playcentre pioneer (born 1903)
 Wi Huata, clergyman (born 1917)
 21 December – Frank Solomon, rugby union player (born 1906)
 24 December – Muriel Moody, potter and sculptor (born 1907)

See also
List of years in New Zealand
Timeline of New Zealand history
History of New Zealand
Military history of New Zealand
Timeline of the New Zealand environment
Timeline of New Zealand's links with Antarctica

References

External links

 
New Zealand
Years of the 20th century in New Zealand